Donna Fournier Cuomo (born March 19, 1947, in Lawrence, Massachusetts) is an American politician who represented the 14th Essex district in the Massachusetts House of Representatives from 1993 to 1999. She later served as the deputy director of the Department of Public Safety's programs division.

Cuomo was briefly a Republican candidate for Lieutenant Governor in 2002. She announced her candidacy on April 2, 2002 and dropped out of the race the next day.

Personal life
Cuomo is the sister of Joseph Fournier, who was murdered by Willie Horton and two other men in 1974. She appeared in an anti-Michael Dukakis ad during the 1988 presidential election.

Cuomo escaped from the World Trade Center during the September 11 attacks.

References

1947 births
Living people
Politicians from Lawrence, Massachusetts
Republican Party members of the Massachusetts House of Representatives
University of Massachusetts Lowell alumni
Salem State University alumni
Women state legislators in Massachusetts
Survivors of the September 11 attacks
20th-century American women
21st-century American women politicians